Kuantan is a city and the state capital of Pahang, Malaysia. It is located near the mouth of the Kuantan River. Kuantan is the 18th largest city in Malaysia based on 2010 population, and the largest city in the East Coast of Peninsular Malaysia.

The administrative centre of the state of Pahang was officially relocated to Kuantan on 27 August 1955 from Kuala Lipis and was officiated by HRH Sultan Abu Bakar Ri'ayatuddin Al Muadzam Shah, the Sultan of Pahang.

History
Kuantan in the first century was a part of Chih-Tu empire. In the 11th century, this piece of land was conquered by another small empire called Pheng-Kheng before being taken over by the Siamese during the 12th century. During the 15th century, Kuantan was ruled by the Malacca Empire.

Kuantan is said to have been founded in the 1850s. The word "Kuantan" was mentioned by Abdullah bin Abdul Kadir (Munshi Abdullah) circa 1851/2 as below:

In its early days, it was known as Teruntum Village (Kampung Teruntum). The village was situated at the mouth of Teruntum River which is in front of the current hospital and it was established by Haji Senik and his followers in the 1850s. Early primary economic activities included fishing and small businesses. The main evidence of the establishment of the village is the cemetery that is situated near Taman Esplanade in front of the current Hospital Tengku Ampuan Afzan.

Towards the late 19th century, arrival of Chinese miners and traders saw the establishment of a township in Kuantan and nearby tin mining areas such as Gambang and Sungai Lembing. Similar to what occurred in other states in Peninsular Malaysia, rubber plantations attracted Indian settlers as well.

The sinking of HMS Prince of Wales and HMS Repulse took place off the coast of Kuantan on 10 December 1941.

Kuantan was declared by Sultan Abdullah of Pahang as a full-fledged city on 21 February 2021 and its town council officially renamed the Kuantan City Council (MBK).

Government
The Pahang state government shifted the administrative centre of Pahang from Kuala Lipis to Kuantan in 1955. The urban area of Kuantan city is located mostly in the mukims of Kuala Kuantan and Beserah.

Kuantan City Council, formerly known as the Kuantan Sanitary Board from 1913 until 1937, the Kuantan Town Board from 1937 until 1953, the Kuantan Town Council from 1953 to 31 August 1979 and the Kuantan Municipal Council from 1 September 1979 until 20 February 2021, is the local authority of Kuantan.

Urban development
Part of the larger East Coast Economic Growth Region (ECER), Kuantan will see many new developments including:

 Kuantan 188 - the tallest observation tower in the East Coast and the second tallest in Malaysia behind Kuala Lumpur Tower at 188m; comes with a viewing deck and restaurant offering views of the Kuantan skyline.
 Relocation of the state administration centre to its proposed site in Kota Sultan Ahmad Shah (KotaSAS).
 Kuantan Port City consist of Kuantan Port expansion, Malaysia-China Kuantan Industrial Park, and Kuantan Integrated Biopark 
 East Coast Rail Link (ECRL) from Kuala Lumpur to Kuantan.
 Kuantan Waterfront Resort City at Tanjung Lumpur.
 Greater Kuantan development that stretches from Kertih, Terengganu to Pekan, Pahang.

Climate
Kuantan features a tropical rainforest climate under the Köppen climate classification. Usually, the area experiences two seasons per year, i.e., the "Dry" and Hot season and the Rainy season. The "Dry" and Hot Season (a relative term as the city does not truly have a dry season) occurs when seasonal south-west winds blow from Sumatra toward the West Coast of Peninsular Malaysia but are blocked by the Titiwangsa Mountain Range. The temperature may reach 40 degrees Celsius. The Rainy season usually occurs between October to March. During this season, the north-east winds bring rain to Kuantan. It can get very cloudy with a large amount of rainfall. Floods may also occur. Areas subject to possible flooding include the road to Sungai Lembing and also a few areas along the Kuantan River.

In 2006, Kuantan experienced significant air pollution that affected visibility because of the haze blowing in from Sumatra and the West Coast of Peninsular Malaysia.

Demographics

Kuantan's population was approximately 427,515 in 2010 which was composed of 78.5% Malay, 17.9% Chinese, 3.3% Indian and 0.3% other races. The following is based on Department of Statistics Malaysia 2010 census. 

By 2019, its population had grown to 529,600.

Economy
One of its major economic activities is tourism. Domestically, it is famous for the production of handicrafts, batik, keropok (dried fish crackers) and salted fish. Kuantan serves as the administrative and commercial capital of Pahang. Trade and commerce are important in the economy of the town. The timber industry, ice cream and the fishing industry also play major roles in the local economy.

There are petrochemical industries, mostly in Gebeng, an industrial area about 25 km north of Kuantan. Among the major companies operating in Kuantan are BASF PETRONAS Chemicals, MTBE/Polypropylene (M) Sdn Bhd, BP Chemicals, MTBE, Flexsys, Bredero Shaw, Eastman Chemical, Kaneka, Polyplastics, Mieco, KNM, JiKang, W.R. Grace, Cryovac, Wasco Pipeline Coatings, AMC, etc.

ECER Special Economic Zone (ECER SEZ)
Kuantan is being identified as a Special Economic Zone (SEZ). The launch of SEZ in 2009 by Prime Minister Najib Tun Razak is one of the first of its kind in Malaysia. The SEZ is located inside East Coast Economic Region (ECER) of Greater Kuantan which stretches from the district of Kertih, Terengganu to the district of Pekan, Pahang. It is now one of the largest SEZs in Asia, covering 390,000 hectares. ECER SEZ serves as a catalyst to fast-track the economic development in the east coast. ECER SEZ aims to generate RM90 billion of investments and provide over 90,000 new jobs by 2020. At the centre of southeast Asia with four seaports (Kuantan Port as the main gateway) and two airports, ECER SEZ will serve good transportation link between Indochina, India and China.

The development master plan will offer special incentives to attract investors. Include tax exemptions, import and export duties exemptions and 100 per cent investment tax allowance.

Tourism

Beaches

Kuantan's main sightseeing attraction is the beach at Teluk Cempedak or Palm Beach. There are scenic beaches popular among vacationers in the city's vicinity, such as Batu Hitam, Balok, Chenor, Pantai Sepat, Beserah, and Cherating. Near Cherating (Club Med is located here) there are turtle sanctuaries. A few kilometres away from Cherating is Pulau Ular (Snake Island). There is a legend connected with this island.

Waterfalls and parks

Kuantan is known to tourists for its waterfalls. The most well-known is the Sungai Pandan Waterfall. Two others are the Sungai Berkelah Waterfall and the Jerangkang Waterfall.

There are four parks in the city, the Gelora Park, Teruntum Mini Zoo, Gambang Safari Park and Agriculture Park at Indera Mahkota. A small park across the main road (and next to the river) in front of the Hospital is named the Esplanade Park or Downtown Kuantan. Here, it is possible to go on a river cruise from the small jetty. The Kuantan area also produces handicrafts and batik. Other tourist attractions include the State Mosque (Masjid Negeri).

Sungai Lembing

Sungai Lembing is located about 26 km northwest of Kuantan. It used to contain the world's deepest underground tin mines. There is an interesting Tin Museum in the former mining town of Sungai Lembing. Just north of the Tin Museum is a "hanging bridge" (jambatan bergantung). Access is via a narrow, winding road at the base of the entrance to the Tin Museum. There is another hanging bridge on the outskirts of Sungai Lembing town (visible from the main road, on the right side). There is a Panorama Hill which provides an impressive pre-dawn view. On the Kuantan-Sungai Lembing road at the hamlet of Pancing, there is a limestone mountain which houses a large reclining Buddha in one of its caves, Charah Cave. The highest peak, Gunung Tapis, also can be accessed from here.

Theme parks
Bukit Gambang Resort City (BGRC) is one of the largest water theme park resorts in Malaysia, spanning 547 acres and offering a 17.1-acre lake, and a 24,000 square feet wave pool. Bukit Gambang Safari Park, the biggest safari in east coast of Peninsular Malaysia.

Accommodations
Kuantan has a wide range of accommodation option for the weary traveller, whether on business or leisure.

Five-star luxury properties include the following:
 Club Med Cherating (the first to open in Asia in 1984)
 Hyatt Regency Kuantan Resort  (pioneer international hotel in town, in business since 1980)
 The Kasturi (luxury boutique resort owned by famed Malaysian architect Hijjas Kasturi)
 Mangala Resort & Spa (resort sitting on rehabilitated former tin mining land in Gambang - 25 km from Kuantan City)
 The Zenith Hotel (the only 5-star hotel in the middle of Kuantan City, and also its tallest building)

As well as a wide range of four-star options:
 AC Hotel by Marriott Kuantan City Center (formerly Vistana Hotel)
 Grand Darulmakmur Hotel (formerly MS Garden)
 Holiday Villa Beach Resort Cherating
 Royale Chulan Cherating
 Swiss-Belhotel Kuantan (part of the Kuantan Waterfront City development)
 Swiss-Garden Beach Resort

Shopping
Main shopping malls in Kuantan:
Located in Putra Square which consists of a 5-star hotel and corporate tower, convention centre and cultural towns. The main anchor of the mall is Parkson and AEON Big Hypermarket while the other tenants that also operated in this mall includes GSC, Padini Concept Store, Guess Jeans, Tommy Hilfiger, CK Jeans, Sacoor, JD Sports, Habib and many more.
 Kuantan City Mall opened in 2017 is a 7-storey shopping centre with 1,300 car parking lots, approximately 200 retail shops with 468,000 square feet rentable. The development is owned fully by Family Mall Sdn Bhd.
 Berjaya Megamall opened in 1998 is still a great place for shopping. Two concourse mall houses great fashion boutiques and shops. Berjaya Megamall has a hypermarket, a karaoke centre, bowling centre, snooker centre, and a five-screen cinema (now closed).
 Kuantan Parade is popular among locals, most celebrities roadshows or events are held here.
 Teruntum Complex is the first shopping mall in Kuantan. The complex is famous with cellular shop and the largest karaoke centre in the region.
 Serambi Teruntum located in Tanjung Lumpur area is the marketplace for local products such as food, textiles and seafood.
 MARA Digital @ Kuantan at Plaza Segambut is the centre for electronic and gadget.
 Coming soon: AEON Mall Kuantan and KRWC Mall.
Other shopping complexes are Kuantan Plaza and the Pasar Besar. There are also many supermarkets from the local retailers that spread over the municipality of Kuantan.

Kuantan 188

Kuantan 188, previously known as Teruntum Tower is a 3-story, 188-meter-tall tower in Kuantan, Pahang, Malaysia. It is the Malaysia's second tallest tower after the Kuala Lumpur Tower and the second-tallest in East Coast Economic Region after the newly completed Grand Ion Majestic in Genting Highlands, which is Pahang's tallest building. Its construction was started on August 2017 and completed on 3 September 2019. It features an observation deck at 92 meter high, restaurant at 98 meter high and an open sky-deck at 104 meter high. The tower offers 360-degree view of the Kuantan River and Kuantan City.

Design and concept

The design of the tower was inspired by spear head which is one of element on the Pahang's Coat of Arms while the tower's porch inspired by Lumnitzera Tree.

There are also some symbolic concept behind the tower's design:

 The tower's porch symbolize the diversity of the people of Kuantan and Pahang.

 Five connected steel post of the spire represent five principles of the Rukun Negara as the core of people's unity. It also represent the five Pillars of Islam.

 Golden tower's pinnacle symbolize the sovereignty of the Sultan of Pahang.

Inauguration

Kuantan 188 was official inaugurated on 21 February 2021 by the Yang di-Pertuan Agong Al-Sultan Abdullah (who also is the Sultan of Pahang) via video footage played on a giant screen during the event. The tower opened as new iconic landmark for the new proclaimed city of Kuantan. It expected to revitalize the state tourism sector by attracting thousand of tourists to the city.

Al-Sultan Abdullah was represented by his heir, the regent of Pahang Crown Prince Tengku Hassanal Ibrahim Alam Shah along side of his other sons, Tengku Muhammad Iskandar Ri’ayatuddin Shah and Tengku Ahmad Ismail Mu’adzam Shah. Other honorable guests including the Chief Minister of Pahang Wan Rosdy Wan Ismail, Senior Minister of Infrastructure Development Fadillah Yusof, then Minister of Communications and Multimedia Saifuddin Abdullah, Speaker of the Pahang State Legislative Assembly Ishak Muhamad, Pahang State Government Secretary Salehuddin Ishak, Mayor of Kuantan City Hamdan Hussin and other members of federal cabinet and Pahang State Government.

During the event, the honorable guests also witnessed a boat parade by the federal government, state government, local authorities and defense forces along the Pahang River.

Timeline of tallest structures in Kuantan

Culture

Cuisine
Kuantan is famous among locals and tourists for its fish crackers (called keropok in Malay) and salted fish, where the fish are marinated mainly with salt and left out to dry in the sun for days and sold at the market, Serambi Teruntum in Tanjung Lumpur. Fresh grilled fish or ikan bakar can be purchased at Tanjung Lumpur and Beserah area mostly located near fishermen's village.

Many types of local food can be found at the city centre.

Very popular and sold by street vendors (especially at the night markets) are varieties of satay which consists of grilled meat on a stick which is dipped into peanut sauce and roti canai, a thick flatbread dipped in a dhal curry sauce.

Typical ethnic Indian dishes include the naan and tandoori chicken.

Healthcare

Medical needs are served by several hospitals and clinics. The main hospital is Tengku Ampuan Afzan Hospital, which is equipped with state-of-the-art equipment such as a CT scanner and MRI.

In Indera Mahkota, there are the International Islamic University Medical Center International Islamic University Malaysia.

There are several private medical centres operate in city: KPJ Pahang Specialist Hospital, Kuantan Medical Center (KMC), Hospital Pakar PRK Muip, KCDC Hospital and Darul Makmur Medical Center.

A Community Health Centre serves suburbs such as Beserah, while smaller clinics are in smaller suburbs such as Bandar Indera Mahkota.

Education

Higher education

There are many institutes of higher learning in Kuantan. They are categorised as Institut Pengajian Tinggi Awam (IPTA); public university or Institut Pengajian Tinggi Swasta (IPTS); private university. Two of the public institutes in Kuantan is Politeknik Sultan Ahmad Shah (POLISAS) & Politeknik METrO Kuantan (PMKu). POLISAS established in 1976 and PMKu established on 1 April 2011.

The International Islamic University Malaysia (IIUM), which is a branch from the main campus in Gombak. There are two IIUM campuses in Kuantan. The Jalan Hospital campus (JHC) campus that opened on year 1997 and the  Indera Mahkota campus on year 2004. IIUM Kuantan focuses on medical related degree programmes offered through several faculties or Kulliyyahs such as: Kulliyyah of Medicine, Kulliyyah of Pharmacy, Kulliyyah of Allied Health Sciences (Radiography, Optometry, Dietetics, Audiology, Physiology and Biomedical Science), Kulliyyah of Nursing, and Kulliyyah of Science (Biotechnology, Computational and Theoritical Sciences (CTS), Applied Chemistry, Physics, Marine Science, Plant Science, and Applied Plant Science), Kulliyyah of Dentistry.

The Jalan Hospital campus (JHC) campus houses the notable IIUM Breast Centre, a centre devoted to the research and diagnosis of breast cancer.

Kolej Komuniti Kuantan was founded in 2001 and currently operating at a permanent campus in Bandar Indera Mahkota.

The Universiti Malaysia Pahang (UMP) was founded in 2002 and located in Gambang. UMP offers undergraduates and postgraduates education mainly in engineering and technical fields through its 7 faculties and centre. UMP has a newly built main campus in Pekan.

Private colleges and institutes

 International Islamic University Malaysia (IIUM)
 Tunku Abdul Rahman University College
 Open University Malaysia (OUM)
 Kolej Universiti Islam Pahang Sultan Haji Ahmad Shah (KUIPSAS)
 Widad University College
 Kolej Yayasan Pahang
 Kolej Poly-Tech MARA
 Kolej Matrikulasi Pahang (KMPh)
 Olympia College
 Institut ECMA
 Institut Latihan Perindustrian Kuantan (ILP Kuantan)
 Institut Teknologi MIDAS
 Institut Saga
 Kolej Kemahiran Tinggi MARA (KKTM)
 Kolej Komuniti Paya Besar, Gambang
 Kolej Professional Mara Indera Mahkota
 Kolej PSDC
 Kolej Teknologi Cosmopoint
 Malaysian Aviation Training Academy (MATA Aviation)

Secondary schools
Secondary school (high school) education is provided by Sekolah Menengah Kebangsaan (National Secondary School) (e.g., SMK Air Putih), Sekolah Menengah Jenis Kebangsaan (National-type School) Chinese primary schools and Religious schools (e.g., SMA Al-Ihsan). All follow the syllabus and curriculum provided and regulated by the Malaysian Ministry of Education (Kementerian Pendidikan Malaysia).

Alternatives to national education are provided by international schools which do not follow the Malaysian education curriculum. This includes the International School of Kuantan, grades K to 12.

Transportation

Land

Kuantan is connected to Kuala Lumpur via the East Coast Expressway and Karak Expressway. Kuantan is now more accessible by road transportation than before, primarily because of the opening of East Coast Expressway. The East Coast Expressway, which begins in Gombak, Selangor and ends near Kuala Terengganu, also links Kuantan to other major towns in Pahang.

Besides Kuala Terengganu and Kota Bharu, the other two capitals of the east coast, the scenic coastal road (Federal Route 3) also runs southward through Pekan, Kuala Rompin, Mersing before terminating in Johor Bahru just before the interchange to Singapore. This route winds through verdant forests and small coastal towns, and a stretch of beautiful quiet beaches at Rompin and Lanjut. Alternatively, Tun Razak Highway Federal Route 12 that runs from the town of Segamat, Johor to Gambang and proceeding to Gambang-Kuantan Highway Federal Route 2 also connects Kuantan with Johor Bahru.

Kuantan Bypass is a highway that runs from Kuantan Port to Kuantan Airport. Interchange are available at Bandar Indera Mahkota, Bandar Damansara Kuantan, East Coast Expressway, Jerangau Highway Federal Route 14, Semambu and major roads.

Alternatively, express buses to Kuantan depart from Kuala Lumpur. Tickets for these buses are available from Hentian Pekeliling or Terminal Bersepadu Selatan (TBS) in Kuala Lumpur. These express buses will stop at the Terminal Kuantan Sentral at Bandar Indera Mahkota. There's local bus services stationed at the bus stop in Kuantan General Market near the Darul Makmur Stadium. This station provides services to Cherating, Pekan and nearby destinations. RapidKuantan buses are accessible to most places in Kuantan even from Pekan, the neighbouring town and from Kemaman in Terengganu. The main stop centre of RapidKuantan is near the General Market (Pasar Besar) and the Darul Makmur Stadium.

Rail
The upcoming MRL East Coast Rail Link, connecting Kota Bharu and Port Klang, will serve the city. The line is expected to enter operation by 2027.

Air

Kuantan is served by Sultan Haji Ahmad Shah Airport. This is the only airport in Pahang State that is controlled by Malaysia Airport Bhd. Currently, the airlines that fly to Kuantan: Malaysia Airline System (MAS), Firefly, Scoot, Malindo and AirAsia. Firefly has scheduled direct flights to Singapore and Penang. In 2009, the airport handled 226,912 passengers on 3,110 flights, though the airport is able to handle over one million passengers annually. In 2008, Taiwan and Tourism Malaysia had co-operated that there were 23 charter flights directly from Taipei to Kuantan Airport, this condition had made Kuantan Sultan Ahmad Shah Airport the first airport in East Coast of Peninsular Malaysia that received international flights. Passengers have to walk from the plane to the arrival hall. Planes from Kuantan fly directly to KLIA , Subang Airport, Singapore Changi Airport and Penang International Airport. Seasonal flights to Taipei are operated by China Airlines. Royal Malaysian Air Force, also operates from the nearby RMAF Kuantan.

Sea
Kuantan Port, an all-weather port is a multi-cargo seaport facing South China Sea. New Deep Water Terminal (NDWT) is currently being developed adjacent to the port. Upon completion, Kuantan Port is envisaged to be the main gateway to China and the Far East. The port is part of the 21st Century Maritime Silk Road.

In popular culture

 Kuantan features prominently in the first part of Nevil Shute's 1949 novel A Town Like Alice
 Kuantan is mentioned in the Command & Conquer video game series backstory as being a major base of operations of the Brotherhood of Nod.
 Box-office success local movie "Woohoo"(2010) was shot at Beserah, Kuantan.
 In "Polis Evo 2", "Bongsun", the fictional placement is located in Kuantan, where this place is a shooting location.
 Famous social responsibility site, KCPbantu is based in Kuantan.

International relations

Sister cities
Kuantan currently has one sister city:

References

External links

Kuantan City Portal | KCPbantu Laman Bantuan untuk Rakyat Malaysia
Official website of Kuantan Municipal Council
Pahang Tourism Official Website
Satellite Image of Kuantan City
Weather forecast for Kuantan City

Visit Pahang Official Website

 
Populated places in Pahang
Port cities in Asia
Populated coastal places in Malaysia